DZOZ-DTV (channel 33) is a television station in Metro Manila, Philippines, serving as the flagship of the Light TV network. It is owned and operated by ZOE Broadcasting Network alongside A2Z flagship DZOE-TV (channel 11) (which is operated by ABS-CBN Corporation under a blocktime agreement). Both stations share studios at the 22nd floor, Strata 2000 Bldg., F. Ortigas Jr. Road (formerly Emerald Avenue), Ortigas Center, Pasig, while DZOZ-DTV's transmitter is located at Crestview Heights Subdivision, Barangay San Roque, Antipolo, Rizal.

Channel history

Before 2006, ZOE Broadcasting Network operated on VHF Channel 11, after being awarded from its previous owner Delta Broadcasting System in 1998. By 2005, ZOE Broadcasting agreed to lease the entire airtime of ZOE-TV Channel 11 to Citynet Network Marketing and Productions, Inc., a subsidiary of GMA Network, Inc., in exchange of airing programs of ZOE-TV in GMA Network and an upgraded transmitter facilities for ZOE-TV on GMA Tower of Power. However, due to increasing lease payments of GMA Network to ZOE Broadcasting which is accompanied with decreased revenues of the former, GMA/Citynet terminated its agreement by June 4, 2019, with Channel 11 shutting down on the following day. Channel 11 would  again reactivated its transmitter in June 2020, and became an affiliate of ABS-CBN, due to the latter's expiration of their franchise; currently airing as A2Z Channel 11 since October 2020.

ZOE Broadcasting began its test broadcast in UHF Channel 33 in May 2006. At that time, it with its airing of job opening program Future Finder on limited broadcast hours in preparation for a relaunch of DZOZ-TV's new branding on November 27, 2006. On that day, after the series of test broadcasts, it began broadcasting, then under a blocktime agreement between ZOE and Makati-based Estima, Inc. The result of the deal was student-oriented channel UniversiTV. The channel has proven to be a hub for college and university students, catering them with evening and overnight programs every day. By that time, it operated from 4 pm to 8 am the following day, but eventually retracted its broadcast hours until 4 am during its last few months of airing. However, on March 10, 2008, UniversiTV ceased its agreement with Channel 33, possibly due to poor ratings and lack of advertisers' support. This made ZOE TV left with almost no programming to offer along with its old Station ID, though, they surprisingly aired entertainment programs in the evening and a weekday morning TeleRadyo-formatted news program under the ZTV 33 brand. UniversiTV on the other hand, was then relaunched as a Pay TV channel via satellite and cable operators, but totally ceased operations by 2010.

On March 1, 2011, (a day after the network's sister station Channel 11 was relaunched as GMA News TV, seen on Channel 27 until 2021; which is now known as GTV), Channel 33 was rebranded as Light TV 33, introducing new programs produced by ZOE, and at the same time, the network launched its flagship newscast entitled News Light. Soon, Channel 33 regained all of its programming with programs mostly dedicated to religious formats. On March 31, 2014, Light TV 33 was renamed as Light Network, launched its refreshed logo, and had a new slogan called "Experience Light", while retaining the slogan "Kaibigan Mo" (Your Friend).

On February 12, 2018, Light Network was renamed back as Light TV with its new slogan "God's Channel of Blessings". At the same time, the channel started live broadcasts of JIL Worship Services during Sunday mornings (simulcast via A2Z Channel 11 since November 1, 2020) and Jesus the Healer Friday Night Healing Services.

On March 4, 2019, Light TV has launched the new radio-on-television format show Light TV Radio which aired Daylight Devotions, News Light sa Umaga, and Bangon na Pilipinas. Then followed by the Edge TV. These programs are streamed online via Light TV Facebook Page, and simulcast on DZJV 1458 kHz in Laguna and DWZB 91.1 FM in Palawan, while Edge TV is also streamed online through their Facebook page. But on October 5, 2019, since UCAPehan has successfully launch on Light TV, the station signs on at 9:00 am every Saturday, but on January 4, 2020, it retracted its Saturday hours of operations from 12:00nn to 11:00pm, a week after the last airing of UCAPehan on December 28, 2019.

Digital television

Digital channels

DZOZ-TV operates on UHF Channel 33 (587.143 MHz), and is multiplexed into the following subchannels:

Analog-to-digital conversion
On March 1, 2017, Light Network became the first television network in the country to abandon analog transmissions and migrated to digital television. The night before, network chief engineer Antonio Soriano permanently ceased Channel 33's analog signal, triggering the country's shift to all-digital television. The station then flash-cut the digital signal to the abandoned analog channel for post-transition operations. However, the arrangement had ended, when the management decided to reactivate its old flagship station, Channel 11 (currently as A2Z Channel 11), one year after GMA News TV (now GTV) left the frequency and moved to UHF 27.

Areas of coverage

Primary areas 
 Metro Manila 
 Cavite
 Rizal
 Laguna
 Bulacan

Secondary areas 
 Portion of Bataan
 Portion of Pampanga
 Portion of Nueva Ecija

See also
 ZOE Broadcasting Network
 DZOE-TV
 A2Z

References

ZOE Broadcasting Network
Digital television stations in the Philippines
Television channels and stations established in 2006
Television stations in Metro Manila
Religious television stations in the Philippines